The 1950–51 NBA season was the fifth season of the National Basketball Association. The season ended with the Rochester Royals winning the NBA Championship, beating the New York Knicks 4 games to 3 in the NBA Finals.

Notable occurrences 
 The NBA began recording rebounds.
 The NBA contracted, losing six teams (Anderson Packers, Sheboygan Red Skins and Waterloo Hawks jumped to the NPBL, while the Chicago Stags, Denver Nuggets and St. Louis Bombers folded) and shrank from 17 teams to 11 before the season started. Midway through the season, the Washington Capitols folded as well, bringing the number of teams in the league down to ten. Washington, D.C. would not have another professional basketball team until the American Basketball Association’s Oakland Oaks relocated there for one season in 1969–70. Washington’s next NBA team would not be established until a future reformed version of the Baltimore Bullets relocated there in 1973.
 Earl Lloyd became the NBA's first Black player when (in the opening game of the season in Rochester) the Washington Capitols put him in the game after halftime. He went on to score six points and grab a game-high 10 rebounds, but the breaking of the color barrier merited barely a mention in news reports of the time. Chuck Cooper of the Boston Celtics and Nat "Sweetwater" Clifton of the New York Knicks also played in their teams' openers within a few days.
 The lowest scoring game in NBA history occurred on November 22, 1950, where the Fort Wayne Pistons would defeat the Minneapolis Lakers by the final score of 19–18. It would be a catalyst for the NBA to implement the shot clock a few seasons later.
 The longest game in NBA history (by playing time) took place on January 6, 1951, between the Indianapolis Olympians and the Rochester Royals. The game, held in Rochester at Edgerton Park Arena, ended 75–73 after 78 minutes, including six overtimes. The overtimes saw only 18 points scored between the two teams, so this game also became a factor in the introduction of the shot clock.
 The first annual NBA All-Star Game, a showcase of the league's top players, was played in Boston, Massachusetts, with the East beating the West 111–94. Ed Macauley of the Boston Celtics received the first NBA All-Star Game Most Valuable Player Award.

Final standings

Eastern Division

Western Division

x – Clinched playoff spot

Playoffs

Statistics leaders

Note: Prior to the 1969–70 season, league leaders in points, rebounds, and assists were determined by totals rather than averages.

NBA awards

All-NBA First Team:
Alex Groza, Indianapolis Olympians
Ralph Beard, Indianapolis Olympians
Bob Davies, Rochester Royals
George Mikan, Minneapolis Lakers
Ed Macauley, Boston Celtics

All-NBA Second Team:
Frank Brian, Tri-Cities Blackhawks
Joe Fulks, Philadelphia Warriors
Dick McGuire, New York Knicks
Vern Mikkelsen, Minneapolis Lakers
Dolph Schayes, Syracuse Nationals

References